Prodysderina is a genus of spiders in the family Oonopidae. It was first described in 2013 by Platnick et al.. , it contains 9 species.

Species
Prodysderina comprises the following species:
Prodysderina armata (Simon, 1893)
Prodysderina filandia Platnick, Dupérré, Berniker & Bonaldo, 2013
Prodysderina janetae Platnick, Dupérré, Berniker & Bonaldo, 2013
Prodysderina megarmata Platnick, Dupérré, Berniker & Bonaldo, 2013
Prodysderina otun Platnick, Dupérré, Berniker & Bonaldo, 2013
Prodysderina piedecuesta Platnick, Dupérré, Berniker & Bonaldo, 2013
Prodysderina rasgon Platnick, Dupérré, Berniker & Bonaldo, 2013
Prodysderina rollardae Platnick, Dupérré, Berniker & Bonaldo, 2013
Prodysderina santander Platnick, Dupérré, Berniker & Bonaldo, 2013

References

Oonopidae
Araneomorphae genera
Spiders of South America